Torjus is a given name. Notable people with the given name include:

Torjus Hansén (born 1973), Norwegian footballer
Torjus Hemmestveit (1860–1930), Norwegian Nordic skier 
Torjus Sleen (born 1997), Norwegian racing cyclist
Torjus Værland (1868-1954), Norwegian politician